I Avgi is a daily newspaper published in Athens, Greece. It is called the "Morning newspaper of the Left" and is politically affiliated with Syriza.

It was first published in 1952. Manolis Glezos was for years its editor. During the seven-year period (1967–1974) of the Greek military junta, the newspaper stopped its publication which continued after the reinstatement of democracy.

See also
Politics of Greece
List of newspapers in Greece

References

External links
  

Newspapers published in Athens
Greek-language newspapers
Newspapers established in 1952
1952 establishments in Greece
Daily newspapers published in Greece